This list includes all major auxiliary ships (transports, colliers, tankers, scientific vessels, tugs, among others) in service with the Argentine Navy since being formally established in the 1860s. It does not include vessels prior to that date, nor does it include warships which are listed separately.

The list is organized by type of ship, by class within each type, and by service entry date within each class. Service entry dates indicate the ship's commissioning into the Argentine Navy, and not the ship's entry in service with another navy unless specifically said.

There is a separate list of current ships of the Argentine Navy regardless the type.

Naming tradition 
The current norms establish naming conventions for Argentine Navy ships according to their type;  some of these used for auxiliaries are summarized below.

Avisos, salvage ships, maritime tugs Mariners or civilians of relevance to the Navy.
Icebreakers and polar ships Antarctic coastal geographic features, or names historically related with the Argentine activity in Antarctica.
Transports and tankers Coastal geographic features.
Research ships Maritime port cities.

List of ships

Avisos 
Irigoyen class (US-built)

Zapiola class (US-built)

Sotyomo class (US-built)

Teniente Olivieri class aviso (US-built)

Neftegaz class (Polish-built)

Icebreakers 
 General San Martín class icebreaker (German-built)

 Almirante Irizar class icebreaker (Finnish-built)

Multipurpose ships 
Ciudad de Zárate class multipurpose ship (US-built)

Oceanographic/Hydrographic Research 
 Capitán Cánepa-class (ex Flower-class, Canadian-built)

Comodoro Lasserre-class (ex Colony-class, US-built)

Islas Orcadas-class (ex Eltanin-class, US-built)

Puerto Deseado-class oceanographic ship (Argentine-built)

Hydrographic ships (Argentine-built)

Repair ships 
Achelous class (US-built)

Tankers/Oilers 

Motor ships (various origins) 

Steam ships (various origins) 

Patagonia-class replenishment oiler (French-built)

''Punta Cigueña-class tanker (US-built)Punta Delgada-class tanker (ex-s, US-built)Punta Medanos''-class tanker (Argentine-built)

Training ships 

Libertad class tall ship (Argentine-built)

Fishing training ship (Japanese-built)

Transports and cargo ships 

Motor ships (various origins) 

Steam ships (various origins) 

Chaco class (German-built)

Bahía Aguirre class (Canadian-built)

Bahía Paraíso class (Argentine-built)

Lapataia class (Italian-built)

 Hércules class fast troop transport (British-built)

Costa Sur class  (Argentine-built)

Tugs and salvage 

Steam ships (various origins) 

Harbour tugs (US-built)

Footnotes

See also

 List of ships of the Argentine Navy
 List of active Argentine Navy ships

References

Notes

Online sources 
 ARA official website – Sea Fleet – Auxiliary Units Auxiliaries currently in service supporting the fleet ‘’(retrieved 2009-09-15)’’

Further reading

External links 
 

 
Lists of ships of Argentina
Argentine Navy